Micrococcoides hystricis is a Gram-positive species of bacteria from the family Micrococcaceae which has been isolated from the faeces of an Indian crested porcupine from the Budapest Zoo and Botanical Garden in Hungary.

References

Micrococcaceae
Bacteria described in 2017
Monotypic bacteria genera